Marco Pfiffner (born 25 March 1994) is a Swiss born, professional alpine ski racer who represents Liechtenstein.  He has competed for Liechtenstein at three Winter Olympic Games in 2016, 2018, and 2022.

Early life
Pfiffner was born in Walenstadt in the Swiss canton of St Gallen. He lives in Mauren and represents the Unterland Winter Sports Club (UWV).

Career
Pfiffner began competing in FIS races aged 15. In 2011, he participated in the Junior World Championships in Crans Montana, securing 43rd and 54th place finishes in the slalom and grand slalom.  Weeks later, he took part in the World Championships at Garmisch Partenkirchen. He finished 72nd in the giant slalom and 53rd in the slalom events. He also competed in the 2013 World Championships in Schladming.

Pfiffner was part of the Liechtenstein Olympic Team at the 2014 Winter Olympics in Sochi, Russia. He scored a best finish of 24th place.

On 24 January 2016, he made his World Cup debut at Kitzbuhel. His early World Cup races were in the slalom and giant slalom disciplines.

In 2017, Pfiffner raced in all disciplines at the World Championships in St Moritz. Securing 36th in the Super-G, 42nd in the Downhill, and 34th in the Combined event. His best result was 26th in the slalom.  In January 2018, he won the European Cup Combined event in Saalbach-Hinterglemm.  

Pfiffner was the designed flag bearer for his second Olympic Games, in PyeongChang.  He competed in four races and secured a best result of 25th place in the slalom.

In January 2020, Pfiffner scored his first FIS World Cup points with 29th place in the Labuerhorn Combination event in Wengen.  He took part in the 2021 World Championships in Cortina D'Ampezzo.

Pfiffner was once again part of the Liechtenstein Olympic Team for the 2022 Winter Olympics in Beijing, China. He finished 28th in both the Downhill and Super-G disciplines, and a career-high 11th place in the Combined.

Endorsements
Pfiffner is sponsored by the bank, LGT. He also utilises Salomon and Leki equipment.

References 

Living people
Olympic alpine skiers of Liechtenstein
Liechtenstein male alpine skiers
1994 births
Alpine skiers at the 2014 Winter Olympics
Alpine skiers at the 2018 Winter Olympics
Alpine skiers at the 2022 Winter Olympics
People from Walenstadt